Brooke Annibale (born July 1987) is an American singer-songwriter and musician from Pittsburgh, Pennsylvania.

Music career

Brooke Annibale began songwriting at age 15 and soon was performing in the Pittsburgh vicinity. At the age of 17, Annibale released her first full-length album, Memories in Melody, as her senior project at Moon Area High School. After graduating in 2005, Annibale went to Belmont University, where she graduated in 2009 with a degree in Music Business. 

In 2010, Annibale raised crowd funds with a Kickstarter campaign enabling her to work with producer Paul Moak at The Smoakstack in Nashville. Their sessions resulted in the album, Silence Worth Breaking, which was self-published and released by Annibale on March 15, 2011. The album garnered positive reviews from Annibale's Pittsburgh base, while Brian Palmer of Glide Magazine called it "phenomenal", writing, "Filled with gravitas, passion, joy, sorrow, humility and boldness, the ten tracks that make up Silence Worth Breaking are done in a stunning, hypnotic fashion, encompassing the genres of folk, rock, Americana and pop in masterful ways."

Words in Your Eyes, was released February 5, 2013, and featured at an official launch performance at Club Cafe in Pittsburgh, Pennsylvania, on March 9, 2013.

Annibale's critically acclaimed fourth album The Simple Fear released on October 2, 2015. Produced by Justin March at Paul Moak's Smoakstack studio in Nashville, the release sparked a breakout year for Annibale which led to continuous touring with artists such as Iron & Wine, Josh Ritter, Margaret Glaspy, Great Lake Swimmers, Jesca Hoop, Rufus Wainwright, The Handsome Family, Chadwick Stokes and Aoife O'Donovan. It included a win at the Independent Music Awards for Best Folk/Singer-Songwriter Album as well as appearances at the Philadelphia Folk Festival, Folk Alliance International, and SXSW.

In March 2018, Annibale announced her latest full-length studio album Hold to the Light which released a couple months later on June 8. Produced by Sam Kassirer (Josh Ritter, Lake Street Dive, Craig Finn) at his Great North Sound Society studio in Maine, the album features contributions from Zachariah Hickman (Ray Lamontagne, Josh Ritter) on bass; Josh Kaufman (The National, Josh Ritter) on accompanying guitars; Sean Trischka on drums; and Matt Douglas (Sylvan Esso, Mountain Goats) on woodwinds.

Discography

Albums
Memories in Melody, self-released, March 15, 2005 
Silence Worth Breaking, self-released, March 15, 2011
The Simple Fear, Brooke Annibale Music, October 2, 2015
Hold to the Light, Brooke Annibale Music, June 8, 2018

EPs
Words in Your Eyes EP, Brooke Annibale Music, February 5, 2013
Silence Worth Breaking (Redux), Brooke Annibale Music, May 7, 2021

Singles
"This Holiday", November 15, 2011
"Home Again", June 26, 2020
"What If You", May 9, 2022

Television
Several of Annibale's songs have been licensed for use in television:

Awards and nominations

References

External links
 
 

American women singer-songwriters
American women pop singers
Independent Music Awards winners
Musicians from Pittsburgh
Musicians from Nashville, Tennessee
Singer-songwriters from Pennsylvania
1987 births
Living people
Singer-songwriters from Tennessee
Guitarists from Pennsylvania
Guitarists from Tennessee
21st-century American women singers
21st-century American singers
21st-century American women guitarists
21st-century American guitarists